Bruno Peter Riem (19 October 1923 – 19 June 1992) was a Swiss modern pentathlete. He competed at the 1948 Summer Olympics.

References

1923 births
1992 deaths
Swiss male modern pentathletes
Olympic modern pentathletes of Switzerland
Modern pentathletes at the 1948 Summer Olympics